Nikolay Georgiev (Bulgarian: Николай Георгиев; born 6 September 1998) is a Bulgarian retired footballer who played as a goalkeeper.

Career

Vitosha Bistritsa

2017–18 season 
Georgiev trained with Vitosha Bistritsa in the summer of 2017, before leaving for England to study in University of Bath and play for their college team. He officially rejoined Vitosha on 28 February 2018. He completed his professional debut on 17 March 2018 in a league match against Beroe, keeping a clean sheet. Georgiev also kept a clean sheet in the following game against Slavia Sofia.

On 25 May 2018, Georgiev saved 2 of the penalties in the penalty shoot-out in the final relegation play-off against Lokomotiv Sofia, keeping his team in the First League.

2018–19 season 
Georgiev played a major role for Vitosha's excellent start to the 2018/2019 season. The Bistritsa Tigers won three of their opening five games with Georgiev keeping two clean sheets against Slavia Sofia and Vereya Stara Zagora. By mid-August, the team had already collected more points than during their entire previous season in the elite division.

On 25 September 2018, Vitosha faced Botev Galabovo in the first round of the Bulgarian Cup. After a goalless draw and 8-8 in the penalty shoot-out, Georgiev stepped up to take the winning penalty and sent his team to the next round.

Retirement
Georgiev spend a season in Yantra Gabrovo, before taking the decision to retire in July 2021, at age of just 22.

Career statistics

Club

References

External links
 

1998 births
Living people
Bulgarian footballers
FC Septemvri Sofia players
FC Vitosha Bistritsa players
FC Yantra Gabrovo players
Association football goalkeepers